Helicopelta rostricola is a species of deep water sea snail, a marine gastropod mollusk in the family Addisoniidae, the true limpets.

Description
The length of the shell attains 1.8 mm.

Distribution
This species occurs in the Coral Sea.

References

External links
 To Encyclopedia of Life
 To World Register of Marine Species

Addisoniidae
Gastropods described in 1996